Albert Kaçi (born 11 June 1981) is an Albanian retired football player who last played in midfield for Ada Velipojë in the Albanian First Division.

Club career
He played in UEFA Cup 2005-06, UEFA Champions League 2006-07 qualify rounds for Elbasani. He then played in UEFA Intertoto Cup 2007 and UEFA Cup 2008-09 qualify round for Vllaznia Shkodër .

External links

1981 births
Living people
Footballers from Shkodër
Albanian footballers
Association football midfielders
KF Vllaznia Shkodër players
KF Elbasani players
FC Luzern players
KF Teuta Durrës players
KF Apolonia Fier players
KS Ada Velipojë players
Besëlidhja Lezhë players
Kategoria Superiore players
Kategoria e Parë players